The Lee Kings was a pop group from Sweden, established in 1964 as Lenne & The Lee Kings, and scoring several hits on the Tio i Topp chart.

The group originally consisted of Lenne Broberg, Bengt Dahlén, Bjarne Möller, Olle Nordström and Lasse Sandgren. In 1966, Olle Nordström left the band and was replaced by Mike Watson. Watson was born in Sheffield and later he played with the Swedish group ABBA.

In 1967, Lasse Sandgren left the band and was replaced by Tony Walter, and for a while, Bengt Dahlén and Bjarne Möller also left, and was replaced by Johnny Lundin.

Discography

Albums

Singles

References 

 The Lee Kings from Swedish Beat
 The Lee Kings official website
 SVENSK POPHISTORIA. De 12 största popbanden i Sverige på sextiotalet.
 

1964 establishments in Sweden
Musical groups established in 1964
Swedish pop music groups